The Fussball Club Basel 1893 1991–92 season was their 98th season since the club's foundation. Charles Röthlisberger was the club's chairman for the fourth consecutive year. FC Basel played their home games in the St. Jakob Stadium. Following their relegation in the 1987–88 season this was their fourth season in the second tier of Swiss football.

Overview

Pre-season
Ernst August Künnecke was first-team coach for the second consecutive season. After missing promotion in the previous season, the club's repeated priority aim was to return to the top flight of Swiss football. There were a number of changes in the squad. Erni Maissen retired from his professional playing career. Between the years 1975 to 1982, 1983 to 1987 and again from 1989 to 1991 Maissen played a total of 551 games for Basel scoring a total of 222 goals. 338 of these games were in the domestic league, Nationalliga A or Nationalliga B, 33 in the Swiss Cup, 15 in the Swiss League Cup, 20 in the European competitions (European Cup, UEFA cup, Cup of the Alps) and 145 were friendly games. He scored 116 goal in the domestic league, 23 in the cup competitions, four in the European competitions and the other 79 were scored during the test games. Enrique Mata also retired from his professional playing career and moved on to FC Laufen. Mata had played six seasons with the club and during this time he had played a total of 173 games for Basel scoring a total of 30 goals. 104 of these games were in the Nationalliga A, 14 in the Swiss Cup and 55 were friendly games. He scored 18 goals in the domestic league, five in the cup and the other seven were scored during the test games.

Further players who left the club were Sascha Reich and Patrick Rahmen who both transferred to Young Boys. Brian Bertelsen left the club as well and transferred to St. Gallen, Germano Fanciulli moved on to play for Grenchen and Roman Hangarter returned to FC Brüttisellen. The contracts with Roman Künzli and Patrick Liniger were not prolonged. In the other direction Patrick's brother Micha Rahmen joined from Grasshopper Club, Robert Kok transferred in from Zürich and André Sitek joined from Baden. A number of youngsters joined from their local clubs, Olivier Bauer and Christian Marcolli joined from FC Aesch, Walter Bernhard joined from SV Muttenz, Adrian Jenzer joined from Rapid Ostermundigen, Mourad Bounoua came from French club Mulhouse, Thomas Schweizer from German club SC Freiburg and Gilbert Epars came from Servette. There were also a number of youngsters who were brought up internally.

Domestic league
The 24 teams in the Nationalliga B were divided into two groups, a South/East and a West group. They would first play a qualification round. In the second stage the tops six teams of each group and the last four team of the Nationalliga A would play a promotion/relegation round, also divided into two groups. The top two teams in each of these groups would play in the top flight the next season. Basel were assigned to the West group. Also in this group were local rivals Old Boys. In the two local duals, Basel lost the away game against the Old Boys, 0–4, and could only manage a goalless draw against them in their home stadium. For Basel the season ran well, despite three defeats in the first six games, including this nasty defeat against the Old Boys, Basel had a good run staying unbeaten for the next 15 rounds, winning 11 of these matches. Basel then ended the Qualifying Phase in top position in the league table. In the 22 matches Basel totaled 31 points with 13 victories, five draws and four defeats. The team scored 42 goals and conceded 30.

Basel qualified for the promotion stage and were assigned to group A. Also assigned to this group from the Nationalliga B were Yverdon-Sports, Baden, Locarno, ES Malley and AC Bellinzona and fighting against relegation from the Nationalliga A were Lugano and Aarau. However, the promotion-relegation phase started badly; Basel could only draw four games and lost two from the first six games. Trainer Ernst August Künnecke was released from his position. The two former players Karl Odermatt and Bruno Rahmen took over as coaches ad interim until the end of the season. The results there after were better, but the gap to the leading teams could not be closed. The team ended their 14 matches in this stage with just four victories, six draws, suffering four defeats with 14 points in a very disappointing fourth position in the league table, scoring 20, conceding 22 goals. Therefore, they missed their aim of promotion once again.

Swiss Cup
In the second round of the Swiss Cup Basel were drawn away from home against lower-tier FC Einsiedeln and in the round of 64 away against lower tier FC Willisau. Both games were won easily (6–2 and 2–0). In the round of 32 Basel were drawn at home against Bulle and the game ended with a 1–1 draw after extra time. Basel secured the victory in the penalty shoot-out. In the next round they were drawn at home against FC Bern (5–1 victory). But in the quarterfinals Basel were drawn at home against Lugano. Because this match ended in a 2–3 defeat they were eliminated. Lugano continued and later reached the final, but in the final they were beaten 3–1, after extra time, by cup-winners Luzern.

Players 

 

 
 
 
 

 
 

 
 
 

 

 

 

 
 

Players who left the squad

Results 
Legend

Friendly matches

Pre-season

Winter break

Nationalliga B

Qualifying Phase West

League table

Promotion/relegation Phase Group A

League table Group A

Swiss Cup

See also
 History of FC Basel
 List of FC Basel players
 List of FC Basel seasons

References

Sources
 Rotblau: Jahrbuch Saison 2015/2016. Publisher: FC Basel Marketing AG. 
 Die ersten 125 Jahre / 2018. Publisher: Josef Zindel im Friedrich Reinhardt Verlag, Basel. 
 The FCB squad 1991–92 at fcb-archiv.ch
 1991–92 at RSSSF

External links
 FC Basel official site

FC Basel seasons
Basel